is a private junior college in Oji, Nara, Japan, established in 1998. The predecessor of the school was founded in 1984.

Subject 
 Integrated man subject
 Study major between cosmopolitans
 Infant child care major
 Nursing science major
 Physicotherapeutics major

Outline 
 Private junior college in Japan been managed by school juridical person Nishiyamnto-Gakuen. 
 Students from abroad are accepted at first of foundation of a school. Therefore, power has been put in the cosmopolitan education. 
 It makes efforts by the promotion of the talent active on the child care worker, the nurse, the medical treatment of physical therapist, and the site of welfare now.

About the course after it graduates 
 In the infant child care major, the majority of the graduate are taken to the nursery teacher and the kindergarten teacher about a day nursery and various facilities for children's welfare. 
 As for the nursing science major, the majority are attached to nursing. 
 There are Osaka City University and Kansai University, etc. as a transfer results to the senior college.

External links
  Official website 

Educational institutions established in 1984
Private universities and colleges in Japan
Universities and colleges in Nara Prefecture
Japanese junior colleges
1984 establishments in Japan